The EOS-1Ds Mark II is a digital SLR camera body introduced by Canon Inc. in 2004. It was the top model in the Canon EOS line of digital cameras until April 2007, with a full-frame 16.7 megapixel CMOS sensor. The EOS-1Ds Mark II had the highest pixel count available in a 35mm format digital SLR at the time of its introduction until its successor was announced in August 2007.  It uses the EF lens mount.  The EOS-1Ds Mark II is a professional grade camera body and is large, ruggedly built, and dust/weather-resistant.

Being an autofocus camera, it has multiple autofocus modes and uses a 45-point autofocus system, and an option for manual focusing. Its viewfinder is a "fixed pentaprism". It also has a 2", TFT color LCD. Its dimensions are 156 mm in width, 157.6 mm in height, and 79.9 mm in depth (6.14 in × 6.20 in × 3.15 in).

The camera's image sensor is a single-plate CMOS-based integrated circuit, 24 mm × 36 mm in size; the same as 35mm film. It has approximately 17.2 million total photosites (16.7 million effective pixels in the final output). It uses a RGB primary color filter.

The shutter is an electronically controlled focal-plane shutter. Its maximum speed is 1/8000 of one second and it is rated for 200,000 actuations. Soft-touch shutter release occurs via electromagnetic signaling.

On 20 August 2007, Canon announced the successor to the Mark II: the Canon EOS-1Ds Mark III.

References

External links 

 Canon USA page on the EOS-1Ds Mark II.
 Review and specific information at dpreview.com
 Firmware version 1.1.6

1Ds Mark II
Full-frame DSLR cameras

sv:Canon EOS-1Ds#EOS-1Ds Mark II